Arshad Nadeem (Punjabi and ; born January 2, 1997) is a Pakistani javelin thrower. He represents WAPDA in the domestic competition. He is the first Pakistani to qualify for the final of any track and field event at the Olympic Games and the World Athletics Championships. At the 2022 Commonwealth Games, he created a new national and Commonwealth Games record with a throw of 90.18m and became the first ever athlete from South Asia to breach the 90m mark.

Early life
Arshad Nadeem was born into a Punjabi family in Mian Channu, Khanewal, Punjab. He is the third-oldest among eight siblings. Arshad was an exceptionally versatile athlete from his early school years. Though he dabbled in all the sports on offer in his school — cricket, badminton, football and athletics — his passion was cricket and he soon found himself playing it at district-level tape-ball tournaments. Upon entering grade seven in school, Arshad caught the eye of Rasheed Ahmad Saqi during an athletics competition. Saqi had a history of developing sportspeople in the division, and took Arshad under his wing soon afterwards.

Before settling on javelin throw, Arshad also pursued shot put and discus throw. Gold medals in javelin throw in successive Punjab Youth Festivals and an inter-board meet propelled him on to the national stage, bringing offers from all the leading domestic athletics teams, including Army, Air Force and WAPDA. It was his father Muhammad Ashraf who persuaded him to take up the sport of javelin throw.

Personal life

Arshad Nadeem is married with two children, a daughter and a son. He is a practicing Muslim.

Career

Beginning

Arshad Nadeem started competing in javelin throw events in 2015. In 2016, he received a scholarship from World Athletics which made him eligible to train at the IAAF High Performance Training Centre in Mauritius.

In May 2017, Nadeem won a bronze medal with a best throw of 76.33 metres at the Islamic Solidarity Games in Baku. In April 2018, he set a new personal best of 80.45 metres in the qualification round of the javelin throw event at the Commonwealth Games held in Gold Coast, Australia. He also sustained a back injury following the end of 2018 Commonwealth Games. In August 2018, he won a bronze medal at the Asian Games in Jakarta, Indonesia, where he set a new personal best and national record of 80.75m.

As the only Pakistani athlete at the 2019 World Athletics Championships in Doha, Qatar, Nadeem achieved a new personal best and national record of 81.52m. In November 2019, Nadeem set a national record when he recorded an 83.65 metre throw to win gold for WAPDA at the 33rd National Games in Peshawar. In December 2019, he won a gold medal with an 86.29 metre games record throw at the 13th South Asian Games in Nepal.

2021: 2020 Olympics

He made his debut appearance at the Olympics representing Pakistan at the 2020 Summer Olympics. In doing so, he became the first ever Pakistani track and field athlete to qualify for the Olympics. His father stated that Arshad was not even provided with a good training ground facility prior to competing at the Olympics. Arshad underwent training in his own house's courtyards and streets and is believed to have not received any financial assistance from the Government of Pakistan after qualifying to participate at the Tokyo Olympics.

On 4 August 2021, he qualified for the men's javelin throw event final of the 2020 Tokyo Olympics. He became the first ever Pakistani to qualify for the final of any track and field event in the history of Olympics. He finished fifth in the men's javelin throw event with a throw of 84.62 m.

2022: World Athletics and Commonwealth Games

During July 2022, Arshad Nadeem participated in the 2022 World Athletics Championships in Eugene, Oregon, USA, as the sole representative from Pakistan. He finished 5th in the final with a throw of 86.16m, despite carrying an elbow injury. This was also his season's best throw.

On 7 August 2022, he won a gold medal for Pakistan at the 2022 Commonwealth Games. Despite his injury, he made a games record with his throw of 90.18m in his fifth attempt, surpassing World Champions Anderson Peters' attempt of 88.64 in the competition, meanwhile also becoming the first South Asian to cross the 90m mark. This was Pakistan's first athletics gold medal at the Commonwealth Games since 1962.

Five days later on 12 August 2022, he won another gold medal for Pakistan at the 2021 Islamic Solidarity Games. He made a games record with his throw of 88.55m.

Treatment for injury

Arshad Nadeem left for the UK on 1 December 2022 to get treatment on his injured elbow and knee joint. The Athletics Federation of Pakistan arranged for him to be treated at the Spire Cambridge Lea Hospital. After a ten day rehabilitation and physiotherapy period, it will take him a further four to six weeks to make a full recovery.

International competitions
 NR−National Record
 GR−Games Record
 q−Qualification round

Seasonal bests by year

Awards and recognition 

 Cash Rewards 
For securing 5th Position in the final medal round at the 2020 Summer Olympics in Tokyo:-
  from the Pakistan Sports Board.
  from the Punjab Sports Board.
  from the Water & Power Development Authority of Pakistan.
  from the Chief Minister of Punjab.
  from the President of Pakistan.
  from the Olympic Association Punjab.
  from the Government of Punjab Energy Department.
  from the Lahore District Government.
  from Waqar Zaka Pakistani Crypto Entrepreneur
  from Howdy Islamabad. 
  from the Cheezious Company Pakistan.

For Gold Medal in 2022 Commonwealth Games Birmingham:
   from the Prime Minister of Pakistan
   from the Pakistan Sports Board
  from the Chief Minister of Punjab.

For Gold Medal in Islamic Solidarity Games 2022 Konya Turkey:
   from the Prime Minister of Pakistan

See also
 List of Pakistani records in athletics

References

External links
 

1997 births
Living people
20th-century Muslims
21st-century Muslims
Pakistani Muslims
Pakistani male javelin throwers
Sportspeople from Khanewal
Athletes (track and field) at the 2018 Commonwealth Games
Athletes (track and field) at the 2022 Commonwealth Games
Athletes (track and field) at the 2018 Asian Games
Asian Games medalists in athletics (track and field)
Asian Games bronze medalists for Pakistan
Medalists at the 2018 Asian Games
South Asian Games gold medalists for Pakistan
South Asian Games bronze medalists for Pakistan
South Asian Games medalists in athletics
Commonwealth Games gold medallists for Pakistan
Commonwealth Games gold medallists in athletics
Islamic Solidarity Games competitors for Pakistan
Islamic Solidarity Games medalists in athletics
Athletes (track and field) at the 2020 Summer Olympics
Olympic athletes of Pakistan
Medallists at the 2022 Commonwealth Games